Bijay Kumar Singh is an Indian politician, currently a member of Janata Dal (United) and a member of Bihar Legislative Council.

References 

Members of the Bihar Legislative Council
Year of birth missing (living people)
Living people
Janata Dal (United) politicians